Richard Lloyd George (born May 22, 1953, in Fillmore, Utah) is an American javelin athlete. He represented his country at the 1976 Summer Olympics.

Education
George went to Brigham Young University, earning a BA in Economics and Harvard Business School, earning an MBA.

Career
He served as Vice President of Southern Virginia University. He was CEO of General Resonance LLC and Clene NanoMedicine Inc.

Personal
He married the late Jennifer Geer (1976 to 2015). They had six children. He later married Ann Peterson Tempest in 2018.

References

1953 births
Living people
American male javelin throwers
Olympic track and field athletes of the United States
Athletes (track and field) at the 1976 Summer Olympics
People from Fillmore, Utah
Track and field athletes from Utah
Brigham Young University alumni
Harvard Business School alumni
Southern Virginia University people
American chief executives
American chief financial officers